Joseph Edward Penny Jr. (born 24 June 1956) is an English-born American  former actor best known for his roles as Nick Ryder on the detective series Riptide from 1984 to 1986, and as Jake Styles in the CBS television series Jake and the Fatman from 1987 to 1992.

Biography

Early life
Penny was born in Uxbridge, London to an American father, Joseph Edward Penny Sr., and an Italian mother. He was brought up in Marietta, Georgia, United States. After his parents divorced, he moved to California with his mother. He attended Marina High School in Huntington Beach, California, where he played football and basketball.

Career
Starting with a minor role on Forever Fernwood in 1977, Penny has appeared in numerous TV films and television series, including in major roles on Riptide and Jake and the Fatman. He has also made many guest appearances on television shows including Touched by an Angel, T. J. Hooker, Vega$, Matt Houston, Lou Grant, CHiPs, Flamingo Road, The Sopranos, Diagnosis: Murder, Matlock, Walker, Texas Ranger, Archie Bunker's Place, 7th Heaven, Tucker's Witch, Boomtown, The Gangster Chronicles, and CSI. In 2005, he co-starred with Lea Thompson in the mystery series Jane Doe on the Hallmark Channel.

Filmography

Feature films

Television films

Television series

References

External links

1956 births
Living people
English emigrants to the United States
English people of Italian descent
Male actors from London
Male actors from Huntington Beach, California
People from Uxbridge
American people of Italian descent
People from Marietta, Georgia
20th-century English male actors
21st-century English male actors